ČT art is a Czech national television channel, operated by Czech Television specialising in cultural content. The channel began broadcasting on 31 August 2013, with Tomáš Motl as its first executive director.

ČT art broadcasts from 8 pm to 6 am, and shares its frequency with children's channel ČT :D which uses the remaining hours.

Programming
Each day begins with the news programme Události v kultuře (News in culture), and on Sundays Týden v kultuře (Week in culture), these are supplemented by inputs from live events and current affairs talk shows with cultural themes. Across the week, each day is given a theme for programming:
 Monday - Z první řady (The first row), student work, work from Slovenská televízia.
 Tuesday - ArtZóna
 Wednesday - Klobouk dolů
 Tuesday - Životy slavných
 Friday - Pop-rockové podium
 Saturday - Je nám ctí - celebrities, topics or events, musical show Tečka za sobotní nocí.
 Sunday - World art films, classical music.

Future
Česká televize stated that if ČT Déčko and ČT art proved successful, the two channels would broadcast from separate frequencies and allowing them to broadcast 24 hours a day.

Broadcasting

HD
High-definition (HD) broadcasting via satellite was started on 1 November 2016 using Astra 3B-capacities.

References

External links
Official website

Television stations in the Czech Republic
Television channels and stations established in 2013
Czech-language television stations
Czech Television